McBrayer is a surname. Notable people with the surname include: 

Jack McBrayer (born 1973), American actor and comedian
Jody McBrayer, American singer/songwriter
Terry McBrayer (1937–2020), American lobbyist, attorney, and former politician in Lexington, Kentucky
W. David McBrayer (born 1950), American film and television producer, writer and entrepreneur

See also
McBrayer Arena, in the Alumni Coliseum, multi-purpose arena in Richmond, Kentucky, United States
McBrayer, Kentucky, United States
James McBryer, Scottish footballer